Enrique Mazzola is a Spanish-born Italian conductor. He studied at the Giuseppe Verdi Milan Conservatory.

Renowned as an expert interpreter and champion of bel canto opera and a specialist in French repertoire, Mazzola is in demand worldwide as both an operatic and symphonic conductor.

 Between 1999 and 2003, he was the artistic and music director of the Cantiere Internazionale d'Arte in Montepulciano
He served as the artistic and music director of the Orchestre national d'Île-de-France from the 2012/13 to 2018/19 season
He is nominated as principal guest conductor at Deutsche Oper Berlin from the 2018/19 season
As of July 1, 2021, Mazzola is music director of Lyric Opera of Chicago
In 2022, he is appointed Conductor in Residence at Bregenz Festival

Distinctions 

 October 2018: Mazzola was made a Chevalier de l'ordre des Arts et des Lettres reflecting his significant contribution to musical life in France.
 August 2020: Mazzola has been awarded the Grifo Poliziano 2020. This distinction is reserved for personalities committed to Montepulciano's and its territory's international reputation and who have realized projects promising growth and development.

Selected discography 
 Beethoven: Piano Concerto Nr. 1 & Symphony Nr. 5. Cédric Tiberghien (pianist), Enrique Mazzola (conductor). Orchestre national d'Île-de-France. Label: NoMadMusic
Bellini / Donizetti / Rossini / Meyerbeer: Opera Ouvertures. Enrique Mazzola (conductor). Orchestre national d'Île-de-France. Label: NoMadMusic
 Donizetti: Don Pasquale. Alessandro Corbelli (Don Pasquale), Danielle de Niese (Norina), Nikolay Borchev (Malatesta), Alek Shrader (Ernesto), Mariame Clément (director), Enrique Mazzola (conductor). Glyndebourne Festival Opera, London Philharmonic Orchestra
Donizetti: Il Duca D'Alba. Inva Mula, Arturo Chacon Cruz, Franck Ferrari, Francesco Ellero d'Artegna, Maruo Corna, Enrique Mazzola (conductor). Orchestre National de Montpellier Languedoc-Roussillon
 Donizetti: Poliuto. Mariame Clément (director), Enrique Mazzola (conductor). Glyndebourne Festival Opera, London Philharmonic Orchestra
 De Falla: El amor brujo, El sombrero de tres picos, Fanfare pour une fête. Esperanza Fernández (cantaora), Enrique Mazzola (conductor), Orchestre national d'Île-de-France. Label: NoMadMusic
 Liszt: Klavierkonzerte Nr. 1 & 2. Liebrecht Vanbeckevoort (pianist), Enrique Mazzola (conductor). Brussels Philharmonic Orchestra
Milhaud: La Bien-Aimée / Stravinsky: The Firebird. Rex Lawson (pianist), Enrique Mazzola (conductor). Orchestre national d'Île-de-France. Label: NoMadMusic
 Meyerbeer: Dinorah. Patrizia Ciofi, Étienne Dupuis, Philippe Talbot, Enrique Mazzola (conductor). Chorus and Orchestra of Deutsche Oper Berlin
 Pizzetti: Fedra. Hasmik Papian, Gustavo Porta, Chang Han Lim, Christine Knorren, Enrique Mazzola (conductor). Orchestre National de Montpellier Languedoc-Roussillon
 Rossini: Il Barbiere di Siviglia. Danielle De Niese (Rosina), Björn Bürger (Figaro), Tailor-Stayton, Enrique Mazzola (conductor). Glyndebourne Festival Opera, London Philharmonic Orchestra. Label: Opus Arte (Blu-ray Disc)
 Rossini: Mosè in Egitto. Enrique Mazzola (conductor). Bregenzer Festpiele, Wiener Symphoniker. Label: Unitel
 Verdi: Falstaff. Festival d’Aix-en-Provence, Orchestre de Paris. Label: ArtHaus Musik.
 Ermanno Wolf-Ferrari: La vedova scaltra. Anne-Lise Sollied, Henriette Bonde-Hansen, Francesco Piccoli, Enrique Mazzola (conductor). Orchestre National de Montpellier Languedoc-Roussillon
"Arabesque": Olga Peretyatko, Enrique Mazzola (conductor). NDR Sinfonieorchester. Label: Sony

References

External links
 
 Profile, Askonas Holt

Italian male conductors (music)
21st-century Italian conductors (music)
21st-century Italian male musicians
20th-century Italian conductors (music)
20th-century Italian male musicians
Milan Conservatory alumni
Spanish emigrants to Italy
Chevaliers of the Ordre des Arts et des Lettres
Music directors (opera)